Bodybuilding competition at the 2016 Asian Beach Games was held in Da Nang, Vietnam from 27 to 28 September 2016 at Bien Dong Park, Da Nang, Vietnam.

Medalists

Medal table

Results

158 cm

Prejudging
27 September

Final
28 September

162 cm
28 September

165 cm
28 September

168 cm

Prejudging
27 September

Final
28 September

172 cm

Prejudging
27 September

Final
28 September

176 cm
28 September

180 cm
28 September

References 

Complete results

External links 
Official website

2016 Asian Beach Games events
2016
2016 in bodybuilding